Gilanbar-e Sofla (also Romanized as Gīlānbar-e Soflá; also known as Gīlānbar-e Bālā) is a village in Dowlatabad Rural District, in the Central District of Ravansar County, Kermanshah Province, Iran. At the 2006 census, its population was 69, in 12 families.

References 

Populated places in Ravansar County